Pseudocotalpa is a small genus of sand dune-inhabiting beetles in the family Scarabaeidae, endemic to deserts of western North America.

Pseudocotalpa are robust-bodied beetles that can reach  in length.

References

Rutelinae
Taxonomy articles created by Polbot
Scarabaeidae genera
Beetles of North America